The A636 is a main road in West Yorkshire, England, starting at Wakefield  and connecting with the M1 motorway at junction 39 and with the A637 at Flockton roundabout. It ends at the A635 at Denby Dale 

Roads in Yorkshire
Transport in West Yorkshire
Wakefield